İnterbank A.Ş is a defunct Turkish bank, the successor of the Banque de Salonique founded in 1888 in Thessaloniki and relocated to Istanbul in 1910. In 1969, that bank was sold by its French controlling shareholders and renamed . It was renamed Interbank A.Ş. in 1990, years after being taken over by Çukurova Holding. Çukurova sold its majority stake to Cavit Çağlar's Nergis Holding in 1996. It was taken over by the government's TMSF on 7 January 1999, merged with Etibank, and went into liquidation on 2 July 2001.

In June 1999 prosecutors alleged that in 1998 Interbank had transferred over $650m to Nergis Holding companies - far in excess of legal limits for intra-group transfers. The total amount owed by Nergis to Interbank was said to be over $1.1bn. In 2004 Çağlar and others associated with Nergis were sentenced to three years ten months for bank fraud relating to Interbank. He had initially been acquitted in 2002, but the government appealed, and reversed the acquittal.

References

Banks established in 1888
Banks of Turkey
1888 establishments in the Ottoman Empire
Companies based in Istanbul
Defunct banks of Turkey
2001 disestablishments in Turkey